Ljubomir Vranjes (born 3 October 1973) is a Swedish handball coach and former player who competed at the 2000 Summer Olympics. Since June 2022, he is the head coach of USAM Nîmes Gard.

Career

Club
Vranjes played with Redbergslids IK for eight years, between 1991 and 1999, and has won five Swedish championship titles (1992–93, 1993–94, 1995–96, 1996–97, and 1997–98).

National team
Vranjes was a member of the Swedish national team for eleven years, between 1996 and 2007. With Sweden, he won the European Handball Championship three times (1998, 2000, and 2002), and the World Handball Championship once, in 1999. He also won the silver medal at the 2000 Summer Olympics.

Coaching
After retiring as a player in 2009, Vranjes became the manager of the German team Flensburg-Handewitt with whom he won the 2013–14 EHF Champions League. In 2013 he briefly coached the Serbia men's national handball team.

In 2017, he signed with MVM Veszprém and the Hungary national team, taking over both positions on 1 July 2017.

On 17 December 2019, he took the head coach role of the Slovenia national team. He was sacked in January 2022 after failing to reach the main round of the 2022 European Men's Handball Championship.

On 19 January 2022, he was named the head coach of Handball-Bundesliga club Rhein-Neckar Löwen for the remainder of the season. In June 2022, he became the head coach of French side USAM Nîmes Gard.

Personal life
Vranjes is of Serbian descent, and was born in Gothenburg.

Honours
Player
Swedish Championship:
Winner: 1993, 1994, 1996, 1997, 1998
Runner-up: 1995, 1999

Manager
EHF Champions League:
Winner: 2014

References

External links

1973 births
Living people
Handball players from Gothenburg
Swedish male handball players
Olympic handball players of Sweden
Handball players at the 2000 Summer Olympics
Olympic silver medalists for Sweden
Swedish people of Serbian descent
Expatriate handball players
Swedish expatriate sportspeople in Spain
Swedish expatriate sportspeople in Germany
Swedish expatriate sportspeople in Hungary
Swedish expatriate sportspeople in Slovenia
Swedish expatriate sportspeople in France
Olympic medalists in handball
Redbergslids IK players
BM Granollers players
HSG Nordhorn-Lingen players
SG Flensburg-Handewitt players
Handball-Bundesliga players
Liga ASOBAL players
Medalists at the 2000 Summer Olympics
Serb diaspora sportspeople
Swedish handball coaches
Handball coaches of international teams